Ian Saynor is a British film and television actor. He has appeared in various TV dramas set in Wales, including the film The Corn is Green and episodes of The District Nurse, but is best known for playing Merak in the 1979 Doctor Who serial The Armageddon Factor. He is well known in and around Wales having worked for various production companies, notably S4C, BBC (including BBC Wales and BBC South), and has been involved in many stage productions, mostly in Cardiff and London. He lives in the Cotswolds and is still acting today.

References

External links 

British male television actors
Living people
Year of birth missing (living people)
Place of birth missing (living people)